Kuźnica is a settlement and popular seaside resort in northern Poland, located between Chałupy and Jastarnia on the Hel Peninsula on the southern coast of the Baltic Sea in Puck County, Pomeranian Voivodeship.

Inhabited predominantly by Kashubians. Fishery and tourism are main occupations of inhabitants.

History
The village was first mentioned in 1570. Kuźnica was a royal village of the Polish Crown, administratively located in the Puck County in the Pomeranian Voivodeship. In 1635, in the face of a Polish–Swedish War, Polish King Władysław IV Vasa ordered the construction of the Kazimierzowo sea fort. During the Swedish invasion of Poland (Deluge) in 1655 the Poles withdrew to Puck, and Kazimierzowo was taken over by the Swedes. After the war Kuźnica developed as a fishing village.

During the German occupation of Poland (World War II), several Poles from Hel were enslaved as forced labour to serve new German colonists in Kuźnica.

Gallery

See also
Jurata
Bay of Puck

References

External links
Official website 

Villages in Puck County
Fishing in Poland
Populated coastal places in Poland
Seaside resorts in Poland